Risto Ahti (born 27 August 1943 in Lahti) is a Finnish writer and recipient of the Eino Leino Prize in 1994.

Bibliography

 Talvi on harha, 1967
 Runoja, 1968
 Unilaulu, 1972
 Katson silmiin lasta, 1974
 Oli kerran kultakettu, 1975
 On myös unia, 1977
 Aurinkotanssi, 1978
 Lintujen planeetta, 1979
 Ja niin rakentuu jokin silta, 1981
 Narkissos talvella, 1982
 Loistava yksinäisyys, 1984
 Läsnäolon ikävä, 1987
 Laki, 1989
 Valitse minut, 1992
 Pieni käsikirja, 1993
 Iloinen laulu Eevasta ja Aatamista, 1995
 Iloiset harhaopit.Runoja ja merkintöjä, 1998
 Ilon ääriviivat. Valitut runot 1967–1998, 1999
 Aatamin muistiinpanot, 2000
 William Blake & vimmainen genius, 2001
 Vain tahallaan voi rakastaa. Runoja ja merkintöjä, 2001
 Kukko tunkiolla, 2002
 Runoaapinen. Aistisen, tunteellisen ja älyllisen kirjoittamisen alkeet, 2002
 Sudet ja lampaat (runoja ja huomautuksia), 2003
 Oikkuja ja totuuksia. Runoja ja huomautuksia, 2005
 Runoaapinen. 2, Sanaluvun koetus, 2005
 Kriittinen minä, 2006
 Leikkilauluja!, 2006
 Ei kukaan, 2007
 Puutarhajuhlat vanhassa piispan huvilassa (kanssapuheita), 2008
 Ne kymmenen käskyä, 2008
 Tie, köyhyys, ilo, 2009
 Täsmällinen selvitys ei mistään (runoelma), 2009
 Neron omaelämäkerta, 2010

In English
 Narcissus in winter, 1994

References

External links
 Translated poems from Vain tahallaan voi rakastaa (You can only love deliberately, WSOY, 2001)

20th-century Finnish poets
1943 births
Living people
People from Lahti
Finnish writers
Writers from Päijät-Häme
Recipients of the Eino Leino Prize
Recipients of the Order of the Lion of Finland
Pro Finlandia Medals of the Order of the Lion of Finland
International Writing Program alumni
21st-century Finnish poets
Finnish male poets
20th-century male writers
21st-century male writers